Thelypodiopsis is a genus of flowering plants belonging to the family Brassicaceae.

Its native range is Western Central and Southern Central USA to Northeastern Mexico.

Species:

Thelypodiopsis ambigua 
Thelypodiopsis aurea 
Thelypodiopsis divaricata 
Thelypodiopsis elegans 
Thelypodiopsis juniperorum 
Thelypodiopsis shinnersii 
Thelypodiopsis vermicularis 
Thelypodiopsis wootonii

References

Brassicaceae
Brassicaceae genera